Laurence Faapoi Tasi is a Samoan athlete who has represented Samoa at the Pacific Games.

Tasi is from Fogapoa on the island of Savaiʻi and was educated at Tuasivi College. At the 2019 Pacific Games in Apia he won Samoa's first medal, a silver in the javelin throw.

References

Living people
People from Fa'asaleleaga
Samoan male javelin throwers
Year of birth missing (living people)
21st-century Samoan people